IGIS Asset Management (also IGIS; short for Integrated Global Investment Solution) is a real estate investment firm headquartered in Seoul, South Korea. In 2022, IREI ranked IGIS as the second largest real estate manager in Asia based on assets under management.

Background 
The firm was founded in 2010 as PS Asset Management by Kim Dai Young. In 2012, the firm was rebranded to IGIS Asset Management.

In 2015, Kim stepped down from managing duties of the firm and was succeeded by Cho Kab Joo and Andie Kang who would become Co-CEOs of the firm. Later on Joseph Lee also became an additional Co-CEO of the firm.

In 2018, the firm filed for an initial public offering on the Korea Exchange but the process was stopped after the death of Kim in October. There was a change in ownership of the firm where 45.5% of its shares were transferred to Kim's wife while their son and daughter will inherit none of the shares and would not be involved with management of the firm.

The firm established IGIS Private Equity in 2018. In 2021, it was acquired by Blackrock.

The firm has a venture capital arm named IGIS Investment Partners.

Properties 

 Axa Equitable Center
 Millennium Hilton Seoul
 The One
 Trianon

References

External links 
 

2010 establishments in South Korea
Companies established in 2010
Companies of South Korea
Financial services companies established in 2010